is a town located on Tokunoshima, in Ōshima District, Kagoshima Prefecture, Japan.

As of June 2013, the town has an estimated population of 6,594 and a population density of 105 persons per km². The total area is 62.70 km². Isen is known for its abundant nature, long-lived residents, and Tōgyū (bullfighting).

Geography
Isen occupies the southern tip of the island of Tokunoshima, with the East China Sea to the west and Pacific Ocean to the east.

Climate
The climate is classified as humid subtropical (Köppen climate classification Cfa) with very warm summers and mild winters (average temperature ). Precipitation is high throughout the year, but is highest in the months of May, June and September. Because of its climate, tropical and sub-tropical fruits are in abundance.

Surrounding municipalities
Tokunoshima
Amagi

History
The early history of Isen is difficult to trace, as there was no formal writing system. Archaeological sites have revealed historic ruins (pottery and tools) dating back 30,000 years. The now famous "Kamuiyaki" historic ruins were discovered in 1983 and declared a national historic landmark in 2006. The findings suggest that the Sue ware pottery that spread around the Ryukyu Islands and up into the Kyushu mainland were largely made in Tokunoshima.

On April 1, 1908 Shimajiri Village was founded; it was renamed Isen on June 29, 1921. As with all of Tokunoshima, the village came under the administration of the United States from 1 July 1946 to 25 December 1953.  On 1 January 1962, Isen was upgraded to town status.

Economy
While mountainous in the north, the majority of land is relatively flat and arable, making Isen a prime location for agriculture. Isen's main agricultural products include sugar cane, potatoes, pumpkins, horticulture, and fruit trees.

Education
Isen has eight elementary and three junior high schools.

Local attractions
Isen has numerous sightseeing locations, including the Kamyuiki Ruins, Cape Inutabu, Yamamoto War Memorial, Seta-umi Beach, Kinenbama Beach, and a historical museum showcasing many of the archaeological discoveries found in Isen.

Among historical sites is Shigechiyo Izumi's (泉重千代) grave site. Shigechiyo was Isen's oldest resident, being born on June 29, 1865 and dying February 21, 1986, making him 120 years old at the time of his death. He was inducted into the Guinness Book of World Records for being the oldest living person alive; however subsequent research has brought into question his birth date. He is now widely considered to have lived until he was 105 years old, putting his real birthday as June 29, 1880.

Isen is also famous for Tōgyū (bullfighting). Different from western bullfighting, in Tōgyū two bulls fight each other while people cheer them on. There are four main tournaments held every year: January (New Year Tournament), May (Golden Week Tournament), August, and October (All Tokunoshima Championship).

Noted people from Isen
Shigechiyo Izumi – Japanese centenarian

Notes

External links

Isen official website 

Towns in Kagoshima Prefecture
Populated coastal places in Japan